Joan of the Tower (5 July 1321 – 7 September 1362), daughter of Edward II of England and Isabella of France, was Queen of Scotland from 1329 to her death as the first wife of David II of Scotland.

Life
The youngest daughter of King Edward II of England and Isabella of France, Joan was born in the Tower of London on 5 July 1321. Her siblings were the future Edward III, King of England, John of Eltham, Earl of Cornwall, and Eleanor of Woodstock.

In accordance with the Treaty of Northampton, Joan was married on 17 July 1328 to David, the son and heir of Robert the Bruce, at Berwick-upon-Tweed. She was seven years old and he was four at the time of their marriage. Their marriage lasted 34 years, but it was childless and apparently loveless.
 On 7 June 1329, Robert I of Scotland died and David became king. He was crowned at Scone Abbey in November 1331.

After the victory of Edward III of England and his protégé Edward Balliol at the Battle of Halidon Hill near Berwick-upon-Tweed in July 1333, David and Joan were sent for safety to France. They reached Boulogne-sur-Mer in May 1334, where they were received by Philip VI, her mother's cousin. Little is known about the life of the Scottish king and queen in France, except that they took up residence at Château Gaillard and Philip treated them with regard.

Meanwhile, David's representatives had obtained the upper hand in Scotland, and David and Joan were thus able to return in June 1341, when he took the reins of government into his own hands. David II was taken prisoner at the Battle of Neville's Cross in County Durham on 17 October 1346, and remained imprisoned in England for eleven years. Although Edward III allowed Joan to visit her husband in the Tower of London a few times, she did not become pregnant. After his release in 1357, she decided to remain in England. Joan was close to her mother, whom she nursed during her last days.

Joan died in 1362, aged 41, at Hertford Castle, Hertfordshire. By that time, she had been estranged from David II for many years. She was buried in Christ Church Greyfriars, London, which was heavily bombed in the Blitz. No trace of her tomb now survives.

Ancestry

Notes

Sources

Ashley, Mike. The Mammoth Book of British Kings and Queens. London: Robinson Publishers, 1999. 
Brown, Michael. The Wars of Scotland, 1214–1371. Edinburgh: Edinburgh University Press, 2004.  
Marshall, Rosalind. Scottish Queens 1034–1714. East Linton: Tuckwell Press, 2003.  
Mortimer, Ian. The Perfect King The Life of Edward III, Father of the English Nation. London: Vintage, 2008. 
Panton, James. Historical Dictionary of the British Monarchy. Lanham, MD: Scarecrow Press, 2011.  

|-

1321 births
1362 deaths
14th-century English people
14th-century Scottish people
People from the London Borough of Tower Hamlets
English princesses
Joan of the Tower
Scottish royal consorts
14th-century English women
14th-century Scottish women
Daughters of kings
Children of Edward II of England